"Holdin' Her" is a song recorded by American country music singer Chris Janson. It was released in May 2016 the third single from his album Buy Me a Boat, which was released in late October 2015. Janson co-wrote the song with James Otto.

Critical reception
The song debuted on the Country Airplay chart at No. 58 for chart dated May 21, 2016, but did not enter the Hot Country Songs chart until September 10, 2016. It has sold 168,000 copies in the United States as of March 2017.

Music video
The music video was directed by Edgar Esteves and premiered in April 2016.

Chart performance

Weekly charts

Year-end charts

References

2015 songs
Warner Records Nashville singles
Chris Janson songs
2016 singles
Songs written by Chris Janson
Songs written by James Otto
Song recordings produced by Byron Gallimore